Raymond Xuereb (born 22 September 1952) is a former Maltese footballer. He has played for Floriana, Ħamrun Spartans, Naxxar Lions, Għargħur, Qrendi throughout his career. He has also played for the Malta national football team.

External links 
 

Living people
1952 births
Association football forwards
Maltese footballers
Malta international footballers
Ħamrun Spartans F.C. players
Naxxar Lions F.C. players
Floriana F.C. players